Normandy is a neighborhood in Northeast Philadelphia.  It is located east of Roosevelt Boulevard, in the vicinity of Woodhaven and Byberry Roads, built in 1955- 1956. All of the streets in this neighborhood begin with the letter N. The neighborhood is made up of Cape Cod-style single-family homes, with frame construction. Most of the homes have received additions over the years. The original landowners were Joseph Buckman, who owned  and John Rieger, who owned . The old Nabisco/Mondelez International plant at the southwest corner of Roosevelt Boulevard and Byberry Road was demolished in 2017-2018 to pave way for a present Wawa. Provco Group who owns the real estate is in the process of building a Topgolf facility and is proposing a pair of strip mall-style buildings and a standalone restaurant along Roosevelt Boulevard. Those would be adjacent to the Wawa, which opened near Byberry Road as part of the first phase of the redevelopment of the site.. Devon Self-Storage occupies what used to be Best products, also what was the original Normandy Square market.

The Northeast Village was a wartime military housing project just south of the present Normandy Village.

References 

Neighborhoods in Philadelphia
Northeast Philadelphia